Para-Romani are various mixed languages of non-Indo-Aryan linguistic classification containing considerable admixture from the Romani language. They are spoken as the traditional vernacular of Romani communities, either in place of, or alongside, varieties of the Romani language. Some Para-Romani languages have no structural features of Romani at all, taking only the vocabulary from Romani.

Reflecting the Romani who as a dispersed people reside predominantly throughout Europe over the last thousand years—though with origins in the northern Indian Subcontinent, in regions which are today part of India and Pakistan—the linguistic makeup of most Para-Romani languages are based on Indo-European languages, except for Laiuse Romani (which is based on Estonian) and Erromintxela (which is based on Basque of the Basque region of Spain and France, separate from the Caló Iberian Romani language of Spanish and Portuguese Romani based on the Romance languages of Iberia).

The phenomenon of Para-Romani languages is akin to Jewish languages (other than Hebrew) which are spoken by different communities of the Jewish diaspora and are heavily influenced by Hebrew, such as Yiddish (Judaeo-German) among Ashkenazi Jews, Ladino (Judaeo-Spanish) among Sephardic Jews, or Yevanic (Judaeo-Greek), Italkian (Judaeo-Italian), various Judeo-Arabic languages, etc.

Varieties

Based on Indo-European languages
Armenian-based
Lomavren language
Germanic-based
Angloromani
Scottish Cant
Scandoromani 
Sinti-Manouche (moving from a Romani variant to being Para-Romani)
Greek-based
Romano-Greek
Romance-based
Caló
Slavonic-based
†Bohemian Romani (which was moving towards being a Para-Romani variety prior to extinction)
Romano-Serbian
Persian-based
Afghanistan Gorbat
Persian Romani
Magati

Based on non-Indo European languages
Finnic-based
†Laiuse Romani (Estonian-based)
Turkic-based
Romano-Turkish (Turkish-based)
Crimean-Romani (Crimean Tatar-based)
Kurbetcha (Cypriot Turkish-based)
Basque-based
Erromintxela

References

 
 
Mixed languages